In control theory, a closed-loop transfer function is a mathematical function describing the net result of the effects of a feedback control loop on the input signal to the plant under control.

Overview 
The closed-loop transfer function is measured at the output. The output signal can be calculated from the closed-loop transfer function and the input signal.  Signals may be waveforms, images, or other types of data streams.

An example of a closed-loop transfer function is shown below:

The summing node and the G(s) and H(s) blocks can all be combined into one block, which would have the following transfer function:

 

 is called feedforward transfer function,  is called feedback transfer function, and their product  is called the open-loop transfer function.

Derivation
We define an intermediate signal Z (also known as error signal) shown as follows:

Using this figure we write:

 

 

Now, plug the second equation into the first to eliminate Z(s):

Move all the terms with Y(s) to the left hand side, and keep the term with X(s) on the right hand side:

Therefore,

See also
Federal Standard 1037C
Open-loop controller
Control_theory#Closed-loop_transfer_function

References 

Classical control theory
Cybernetics